The 1963 Cotton Bowl Classic was the 27th edition of the college football bowl game, played at the Cotton Bowl in Dallas, Texas, on Tuesday, January 1. Part of the 1962–63 bowl game season, the game featured the fourth-ranked Texas Longhorns of the Southwest Conference (SWC) and the #7 LSU Tigers of the Southeastern Conference (SEC). LSU shut out the Longhorns, 13–0.

Teams

Texas

The Longhorns were making their second of three consecutive Cotton Bowl appearances after winning the Southwest Conference again. They  were unbeaten, with a tie at Rice.

LSU

The Tigers, who finished third in the Southeastern Conference, lost to Ole Miss and also tied Rice. LSU had won the Orange Bowl the previous season. They were making their first Cotton Bowl appearance since 1947, a scoreless tie (against Arkansas). This was head coach Charlie McClendon's first year at LSU, where he stayed through 1979.

Game summary
LSU quarterback Lynn Amedee's 23-yard field goal gave the Tigers a 3–0 halftime lead. Earlier, Texas' shoeless Tony Crosby had missed from 42 yards, which led to the scoring drive. This was the first field goal in the Cotton Bowl in 21 years.

Amedee recovered a Longhorn fumble at the 37 early in the third quarter and reserve quarterback Jimmy Field scored five plays later on a 22-yard touchdown run. Buddy Hamic recovered a Texas fumble to set up another Amedee field goal thirteen plays later, and the Tigers kept the Longhorns off the scoreboard.

Scoring
First quarter
No scoring
Second quarter
LSU – Lynn Amedee 23-yard field goal
Third quarter
LSU – Jimmy Field 22-yard touchdown run (Amedee kick)
Fourth quarter
LSU – Amedee 37-yard field goal

Statistics
{| class=wikitable style="text-align:center"
! Statistics !! LSU  !! Texas
|-
| First Downs || 17|| 9
|-
| Yards Rushing || 126|| 80
|-
| Yards Passing || 133|| 92
|-
| Passing (C–A–I) || 13–21–0 || 8–22–3 
|-
| Total Yards || 259|| 172
|-
| Punts–Average ||9–41.8|| 8–46.8
|-
| Fumbles–Lost ||0–0|| 2–2
|-
| Interceptions || 0|| 3
|-
| Penalties–Yards ||1–15|| 4–44
|}

Aftermath
The Longhorns played in the Cotton Bowl the following year, went undefeated, and won the national championship.

The Tigers returned to the Cotton Bowl three years later in January 1966.

References

Cotton Bowl Classic
Cotton Bowl Classic
LSU Tigers football bowl games
Texas Longhorns football bowl games
January 1963 sports events in the United States
Cotton Bowl